Nesozineus galapagoensis is a species of beetle in the family Cerambycidae. It was described by Van Dyke in 1953.

References

Acanthoderini
Beetles described in 1953